James O'Hara (born 1959) is an American scholar of Latin literature. He is the George L. Paddison Professor of Latin at the University of North Carolina, Chapel Hill.

Books
Death and the Optimistic Prophecy in Vergil’s Aeneid (Princeton University Press, 1990)
True Names: Vergil and the Alexandrian Tradition of Etymological Wordplay (University of Michigan Press, 1996)
Inconsistency in Roman Epic: Studies in Catullus, Lucretius, Vergil, Ovid and Lucan (Cambridge University Press, 2007)

References

American Latinists
University of North Carolina at Chapel Hill faculty
1959 births
Living people